Alamo Beach is an unincorporated community and census-designated place (CDP) in Calhoun County, Texas, United States. It was first listed as a CDP in the 2020 census with a population of 254. It is located just north of the junction of Farm Roads 2717 and 2760, approximately two miles southeast of Port Lavaca and northwest of Magnolia Beach. The community is situated along the waterfront of Lavaca Bay. It is part of the Victoria, Texas Metropolitan Statistical Area. Today, Alamo Beach is a lightly populated, but developing bay front community.

History
The settlement was established during the first decade of the twentieth century and had a post office from 1907 to 1915.

Education
Public education in the community of Alamo Beach is provided by the Calhoun County Independent School District (CCISD).

References

External links

Unincorporated communities in Calhoun County, Texas
Unincorporated communities in Texas
Victoria, Texas metropolitan area
Census-designated places in Calhoun County, Texas
Census-designated places in Texas